The 1962 Iowa State Senate elections took place as part of the biennial 1962 United States elections. Iowa voters elected state senators in 27 of the state senate's 50 districts. At that time, the Iowa Senate still had several multi-member districts. State senators serve four-year terms in the Iowa State Senate.

The Iowa General Assembly provides statewide maps of each district. To compare the effect of the 1962 redistricting process on the location of each district, contrast the previous map with the map used for 1962 elections.

The primary election on June 4, 1962 determined which candidates appeared on the November 6, 1962 general election ballot.

Following the previous election, Republicans had control of the Iowa state Senate with 35 seats to Democrats' 15 seats.

To claim control of the chamber from Republicans, the Democrats needed to net 11 Senate seats.

Republicans maintained control of the Iowa State Senate following the 1962 general election with the balance of power shifting to Republicans holding 38 seats and Democrats having 12 seats (a net gain of 3 seats for Republicans).

Summary of Results
Note: The 23 holdover Senators not up for re-election are listed here with asterisks (*).

Source:

Detailed Results
27 of the 50 Iowa Senate seats were up for election in 1962. 21 of the races were in newly drawn seats with the borders from this map. However, there were six races for unexpired terms in districts that were using the prior map here.

Note: If a district does not list a primary, then that district did not have a competitive primary (i.e., there may have only been one candidate file for that district).

District 1

District 4

District 5

District 6
The 6th was a 2-member district following the 1962 election. Subdistrict No. 1 had a holdover Senator; however, Subdistrict No. 2 held an election.

District 7

District 8
The 8th was a 2-member district following the 1962 election. Subdistrict No. 1 had a holdover Senator; however, Subdistrict No. 2 held an election.

District 9

District 10

District 14
The 14th was a 2-member district following the 1962 election. Subdistrict No. 1 held an election for a two-year term using the prior district boundaries map; however, Subdistrict No. 2 held an election for a four-year term using the redrawn district boundaries.

District 15

Though he won the general election, L. C. Shivvers was deceased. This necessitated a special election on January 10, 1963.

District 17
The 17th was a 2-member district following the 1962 election. Subdistrict No. 1 had a holdover Senator; however, Subdistrict No. 2 held an election.

District 18

District 22

District 23
The 23rd was a 2-member district following the 1962 election. Subdistrict No. 1 had a holdover Senator; however, Subdistrict No. 2 held an election.

District 25
The 25th was a 2-member district following the 1962 election. Subdistrict No. 1 had a holdover Senator; however, Subdistrict No. 2 held an election.

District 27
The 27th was a 2-member district following the 1962 election. Subdistrict No. 1 had a holdover Senator; however, Subdistrict No. 2 held an election.

District 30

District 31
The 31st was a 2-member district following the 1962 election. Subdistrict No. 1 held an election for a two-year term using the prior district boundaries map; however, Subdistrict No. 2 held an election for a four-year term using the redrawn district boundaries.

District 32
The 32nd was a 2-member district following the 1962 election. Subdistrict No. 1 had a holdover Senator; however, Subdistrict No. 2 held an election.

District 34

District 35

District 37

District 39

District 44

District 45

See also
 United States elections, 1962
 United States House of Representatives elections in Iowa, 1962
 Elections in Iowa

References

1962 Iowa elections
Iowa Senate
Iowa Senate elections